Thoda Lutf Thoda Ishq ( is a 2015 Hindi-language comedy drama film directed and produced by Sachin Gupta and co-produced by Bharat Bansal and Vivek Yadav under the banner of Chilsag Motion Pictures. The film stars Hiten Tejwani, Rajpal Yadav, Sanjay Mishra, Rakesh Bedi, Neha Pawar, Bhavita Anand.

Cast 
 Hiten Tejwani as Jhumroo
 Rajpal Yadav as Ghungroo
 Sanjay Mishra as Neta Ji
 Rakesh Bedi as The Boss
 Neha Pawar as Mini
 Sushmita Mukherjee as Jhumru's mother
 Bhavita Anand as Chuski
 Sanjana Singh as item number

Production 
This movie was shot in Delhi NCR, Etawah, Meerut & Safai.

Release 
Trailer was released on 23 June 2015 by then Chief Minister Akhilesh Yadav at Saifai Mahotsav. The movie was released in India on 10 July 2015.

Music 

The soundtrack album and background score were composed by Vikram Khajuria.

References

External links 
 
 

2010s Hindi-language films
2015 films
Indian comedy-drama films
2015 comedy-drama films